FC Krasnodar Academy Stadium is a football stadium situated in Krasnodar. It is the home ground of FC Krasnodar-2, reserve side of FC Krasnodar. It can accommodate a total capacity 3,500 people and is roofed- also the FC Krasnodar Under-21 branch plays there.

References

Football venues in Russia